Vladimir Alexeyevich Tolokonnikov (June 25, 1943 – July 15, 2017) was a Soviet, Russian and Kazakh film and theater actor, Honored Artist of the Kazakh SSR. He was awarded the Russian Order of Friendship (May 5, 2009).

Biography 
Vladimir Tolokonnikov was born June 25, 1943. In 1973 he graduated from the acting department of Yaroslavl State Theatre Institute.

He worked at the National Academic Theatre of Russian Drama in Almaty after graduating from drama school.

Tolokonnikov became widely known after the film Heart of a Dog, directed by Vladimir Bortko and based on the novel by Mikhail Bulgakov, which appeared in 1988 as a Sharikov.

He played a starring role in director Pyotr Tochilin's Khottabych, embodying on the screen the image of an ancient genie faced with today's Internet culture. For the role Khottabych won Best Comedic Performance at the Russian MTV Movie Awards in 2007.

He died in Moscow on the night of July 15, 2017 at the age of 74. The cause of death was heart failure as a result of bronchitis complications. Buried July 20, 2017 in the 25th plot of the Troyekurovskoye Cemetery. (source ru.wikipedia.org)

Partial filmography 

1981: The last transition as Tolokonnikov
1988: Heart of a Dog (TV Movie) - Polygraph Polygraphovich Sharikov
1988: Balkon
1989: Koshkodav Silver - Murderer
1990: Romantik
1990: Volki v zone
1990: Cloud-Paradise - Felomeev
1990: Noch dlinnykh nozhey - Gorelov
1990: Kletch
1990: Garem Stepana Guslyakova
1991: Prizrak - Ivan
1991: Schastlivogo rozhdestva v Parizhe! ili Banda lesbiyanok - 'Baban'
1993: Mechty idiota - Adam Kozlewicz
1994: Show dlya odinokogo muzhchiny
1996: The Children of Captain Grant - Cave hermit
1996: Shankhai
1996: Shanhai
1997: Gorkiy dym oseni
1998: Ompa
1999: Borshch iz frantsuzskikh lyagushek - Nol
2006: Khottabych - Khottabych
2007: Scratch - Ded Ignat
2008: Nasledniki
2010: Black Sheep
2010: Kitayskaya babushka - Igor
2010: Odno zveno
2011: Rasputin New. Without cover - Grigory Rasputin
2014: Korporativ
2014: Smeshannye chuvstva
2016: Super Family
2017: Pyos Ryzhiy - Ukhvatov
2017: Dukh baltiyskiy - Vilen
2017: Naughty Grandma - Bessonov
2018: The Old Fogy - Mikhalych
2018: Super Family 2 - Pavel Grigoryevich (final film role)

Recognition and awards 
 Vasilyev Brothers State Prize of the RSFSR (1990) for his role Polygraph Polygraphovich Sharikov in the film  Heart of a Dog  (1988)
 Honored Artist of the Kazakh SSR
 Annual independent national award  Club Patrons of Kazakhstan   Platinum Tarlan in the category - Theater (2006)
 MTV Movie Awards   in the category  Best Comedic Performance for his role Khottabych (2007)
 Russian Order of Friendship (2009)

References

External links
 
  Interview. November 26, 2004
 A world-class star Vladimir  Tolokonnikov

1943 births
2017 deaths
People from Almaty
Soviet male film actors
Russian male film actors
Kazakhstani male actors
Recipients of the Vasilyev Brothers State Prize of the RSFSR
20th-century Russian male actors
21st-century Russian male actors
20th-century Kazakhstani male actors
21st-century Kazakhstani male actors
Burials in Troyekurovskoye Cemetery